The Bi-State League was an American baseball minor league formed in 1934 with teams in Virginia and North Carolina. The league held together for nine seasons, being represented by ten cities from North Carolina and eight from Virginia. Only the Leaksville-Draper-Spray Triplets, a team that was a combination of those three cities from North Carolina, was able to make the entire nine-year run. This combination also captured the league title in two seasons, 1935 and 1941. The squad from Bassett, Virginia, won four league titles during the span, coming out on top three times in a row, 1936, 1937, 1938 and closing it out with the 1940 pennant before losing in the finals. The league's final season was 1942, as it was not revived after World War II.

List of teams
Bassett, Virginia:  Bassett Furnituremakers 1935–1940
Burlington, North Carolina:  Burlington Bees 1942
Danville, Virginia:  Danville Leafs 1934–1938
Danville, Virginia & Schoolfield, Virginia:  Danville-Schoolfield Leafs 1939–1942
Fieldale, Virginia:  Fieldale Virginians 1934; Fieldale Towlers 1935–1936
Leaksville, North Carolina, Draper, North Carolina, & Spray, North Carolina:  Leaksville-Draper-Spray Triplets 1934–1942
Martinsville, Virginia:  Martinsville Manufacturers 1934–1941
Mayodan, North Carolina:  Mayodan Senators 1934, 1937; Mayodan Mills 1935; Mayodan Orphans 1936; Mayodan Millers 1938–1941
Mount Airy, North Carolina:  Mount Airy Graniteers 1934, 1938–1941; Mount Airy Reds 1935–1937 
Reidsville, North Carolina:  Reidsville Luckies 1935–1940
Rocky Mount, North Carolina:  Rocky Mount Rocks 1942
Sanford, North Carolina:  Sanford Spinners 1941–1942
South Boston, Virginia & Halifax, Virginia:  South Boston Twins 1937; South Boston-Halifax Wrappers 1938; South Boston Wrappers 1939–1940
Wilson, North Carolina:  Wilson Tobs 1942

Standings & statistics

1934 to 1938
1934 Bi-State League 
 Playoff: Danville 4 games, Martinsville 1.
 
1935 Bi-State League
 Playoff: Danville 4 games, Bassett 3.
 
1936 Bi-State League 
 Playoff: Bassett 4 games, Leaksville 2.
 
1937 Bi-State Leagueschedule
 Playoff: Bassett 3 games, Danville 1; Martinsville 3 games, Mayodan 2, (one tie). Finals: Bassett 4 games, Martinsville 3. 
 
1938 Bi-State League
 Playoff: Bassett 3 games, Reidsville 2; Danville 3 games, Mayodan 0. Finals: Bassett 4 games, Danville 2.

1939 to 1942  
1939 Bi-State League
 Playoff: Leaksville 4 games, Martinsville 1; Danville 4 games, Bassett 3. Finals: Danville 4 games, Leaksville 2.
 
1940 Bi-State League
 Playoff: Martinsville 4 games, Danville 2; Bassett 4 games, Mt Airy 1. Finals: Martinsville 4 games, Bassett 3. 

1941 Bi-State League 
 Mayodan disbanded July 18. Playoff: Sanford 4 games, Martinsville 3,(one tie); Danville-Schoolfield, 4 games, Leaksville 1. Finals: Sanford 4 games, Danville-Schoolfield 2.
 
1942 Bi-State League
 Playoff: Rocky Mount 4 games, Wilson 3; Sanford 4 games, Burlington 1. Finals: Rocky Mount 4 games, Sanford 1.

League champions
1934: Danville Leafs
1935: Danville Leafs
1936: Bassett Furniture Makers
1937: Bassett Furniture Makers
1938: Bassett Furniture Makers
1939: Danville-Schoolfield Leafs
1940: Martinsville Manufacturers
1941: Sanford Spinners
1942: Rocky Mount Rocks

Sources
Encyclopedia of Minor League Baseball – Lloyd Johnson, Miles Wolff. Publisher: Baseball America, 1993. Language: English. Format: Softcover, 420pp.

References

This article is based on the "Bi-States League" article at Baseball-Reference.com Bullpen. The Bullpen is a wiki, and its content is available under the GNU Free Documentation License.

Defunct minor baseball leagues in the United States
Baseball leagues in North Carolina
Baseball leagues in Virginia
Bi-State League teams
Sports leagues established in 1934
Sports leagues disestablished in 1942